Johann Jakob Guggenbühl (August 13, 1816, Meilen – February 2, 1863 Montreux) was a Swiss physician. He is considered as one of the precursors of medico-educational care.

Life 
Guggenbühl showed interest in cretinism and was convinced that this disease could be cured. He created, in 1841, a residential home for mentally-handicapped children in Interlaken that lasted until 1860.

Works 
 Hülfsruf aus den Alpen, zur Bekämpfung des schrecklichen Cretinismus. In: Maltens Bibliothek der neuesten Weltkunde. Band 1, Aarau 1840, p. 191 et seq.
 Briefe über den Abendberg und die Heilanstalt für Cretinismus, 1846.
 Die Heilung und Verhütung des Cretinismus und ihre neuesten Fortschritte, 1853.

See also 
 History of psychiatric institutions

References 

19th-century Swiss physicians
1816 births
1863 deaths